Danków may refer to the following places:
Danków, Greater Poland Voivodeship (west-central Poland)
Danków, Lubusz Voivodeship (west Poland)
Dańków, Łódź Voivodeship
Dańków, Masovian Voivodeship
Danków, Silesian Voivodeship (south Poland)
Danków, Świętokrzyskie Voivodeship (south-central Poland)

See also
 Dankov, Dankovsky District, Lipetsk Oblast, Russia